Suhail Al-Mansoori (Arabic:سهيل المنصوري) (born 19 May 1993) is an Emirati footballer who plays for Al Dhafra as a midfielder. He played for Al-Wahda at the junior level before being promoted to the senior team in 2013  making 39 appearances with a lone goal. he left  Al-Wahda in 2018 and moved to Al-Sharja on loan making 8 appearances and scored one goal there. In 2018, he transferred  to Al Dhafra where he has since scored 11 goals in 55 appearances.

External links

References

Emirati footballers
1993 births
Living people
Al Wahda FC players
Sharjah FC players
Al Dhafra FC players
Footballers at the 2014 Asian Games
UAE Pro League players
Association football midfielders
United Arab Emirates international footballers
Asian Games competitors for the United Arab Emirates